The , also known as the ,  or Great Compassion Dhāraṇī / Mantra (Chinese: 大悲咒, Dàbēi zhòu; Japanese: 大悲心陀羅尼, Daihishin darani or 大悲呪, Daihi shu; Vietnamese: Chú đại bi or Đại bi tâm đà la ni; Korean: 신묘장구대다라니 (Hanja: 神妙章句大陀羅尼), Sinmyo janggu daedarani), is a Mahayana Buddhist dhāraṇī associated with the bodhisattva Avalokiteśvara.

The dhāraṇī is thought to have originally been a recitation of names and attributes of Harihara (a composite form of the Hindu gods Vishnu and Shiva; Nīlakaṇṭha 'the blue-necked one' is a title of Shiva) said to have been recited by Avalokiteśvara, who was sometimes portrayed as introducing popular non-Buddhist deities (e.g. Hayagriva, Cundi) into the Buddhist pantheon by reciting their dhāraṇīs. Over time, these deities became considered to be the various forms or incarnations of Avalokiteśvara, who was described in texts such as the Lotus Sutra as manifesting himself in different forms according to the needs of different individuals; the dhāraṇī thus came to be considered as addressed to Avalokiteśvara as Nīlakaṇṭha, now understood to be a manifestation of the bodhisattva. From Nīlakaṇṭha Avalokiteśvara, this particular dhāraṇī eventually became associated with another of Avalokiteśvara's forms, namely the thousand-armed (sahasra-bhuja) one, and became attached to Buddhist texts concerning the thousand-armed Avalokiteśvara.

Different versions of this dhāraṇī, of varying length, exist; the shorter version as transliterated into Chinese characters by Indian monk Bhagavaddharma in the 7th century enjoys a high degree of popularity in East Asian Mahayana Buddhism - especially in Chinese Buddhism - comparable to that of the six-syllable mantra Oṃ maṇi padme hūṃ, which is also synonymous with Avalokiteśvara. It is often used for protection or purification. In Korea, copies of the dhāraṇī are hung inside homes to bring auspiciousness. In Japan, it is especially associated with Zen, being revered and recited in Zen schools such as Sōtō or Rinzai.

Versions 

Various different recensions of this dhāraṇī are in existence, which can be classified into two main versions: the shorter text and the longer text.

Chinese

The text currently considered to be the standard in most of East Asia is the shorter version, specifically the one found in the so-called 'Sūtra of the Vast, Perfect, Unimpeded Great-Compassionate Heart of the Thousand-Handed Thousand-Eyed Bodhisattva Avalokitasvara's Dhāraṇī' (； T. 1060, K. 0294) translated by a monk from western India named Bhagavaddharma (birth and death dates unknown) between 650 and 660 CE.

Twelve scrolls of  texts in Chinese were found at Dunhuang along the Silk Road in today's Gansu province of China. One of the texts contains a colophon at the end: "Translated at Khotan by the śramaṇa Bhagavaddharma of Western India" (西天竺伽梵達摩沙門於于闐譯). The milieu of this transliteration is evident from Bhagavaddharma's rendering of the word Nīlakaṇṭha as 'Narakindi', a Central Asian form of the Sanskrit word.

Other notable Chinese versions of the dhāraṇī include:

 Two versions by or attributed to esoteric Buddhist teacher Vajrabodhi: (1) 'Copy of the Vast, Perfect, Unimpeded Great-Compassionate Heart of the Thousand-Handed Thousand-Eyed Bodhisattva Avalokitasvara's Dhāraṇī' (T. 1061) and (2) 'Ritual Recitation Manual on the Vajraśekhara Yoga on the Great Compassionate King Nīlakaṇṭha Avalokiteśvara' (T. 1112) The former contains a Chinese transliteration of the dhāraṇī and its corresponding Sanskrit version (in Siddhaṃ script), with the latter being an esoteric ritual manual.
 Three versions of the dhāraṇī proper by or attributed to Vajrabodhi's disciple Amoghavajra: (1) The Thousand-Handed Thousand-Eyed Bodhisattva Avalokitasvara's Great-Compassionate Heart Dhāraṇī (T. 1064) is an extract from Bhagavaddharma's version, with interlinear glosses and an accompanying explanation of the forty hands (forty standing for the full number of one thousand) of the Thousand-armed Avalokiteśvara, each with a mantra of its own; (2) Sutra of the Bodhisattva Nīlakaṇṭha Avalokiteśvara's Heart Dhāraṇī (T. 1111) is a new transliteration, followed by a description of the iconography of Nīlakaṇṭha-Avalokiteśvara and his particular mudra; and (3) The Greatly Merciful (and) Greatly Compassionate Bodhisattva Avalokitasvara-lokeśvararāja's Vast, Perfect, Unimpeded Great-Compassionate Heart of Nīlakaṇṭheśvara Dharani (T. 1113b) is a Sanskrit (Siddhaṃ)-Chinese interlinear version with glosses.
 A version of the dhāraṇī proper by 14th century by Dhyānabhadra (died 1363) with the title Dhāraṇī of the Vast, Perfect, Unimpeded Great-Compassionate Heart of the Bodhisattva Avalokiteśvara (T. 1113a) Unlike the aforementioned versions, Dhyānabhadra's text is based on the longer form of the dhāraṇī.

In addition, there are texts bearing the "Thousand-armed Avalokiteśvara" title, but which feature a completely different dhāraṇī within the text.

 Two translations by a monk named Zhitōng made between 627 and 649, both entitled Sūtra of the Thousand-Eyed Thousand-Armed Bodhisattva Avalokitasvara's Mystic Dhāraṇī (T. 1057a and 1057b, Nj. 318) This is the earliest of the Chinese "Thousand-armed Avalokiteśvara" sutras. Despite the title, the sutra's dhāraṇī is completely different from the Nīlakaṇṭha dhāraṇī found in other versions.
 A translation made by north Indian monk Bodhiruci in 709 entitled Sūtra of the Thousand-Handed Thousand-Eyed Bodhisattva-mother Avalokitasvara's Dhāraṇī-body (T. 1058, Nj. 319) Bodhiruci's version contains the same dhāraṇī as Zhitōng's.

Tibetan

At least three versions of the longer form of the dhāraṇī exist in Tibetan. One was made in the middle of the 9th century by a translator named Chödrup (Wylie: Chos grub; Chinese: 法成 Fǎchéng) supposedly from Chinese, but which does not correspond exactly to any Chinese version, being more akin to that of Vajrabodhi. Among the various versions of the dhāraṇī, it is the longest and fullest. Preceding Chödrup is an anonymous translation of the same text.

A third version was made by Changkya Rölpé Dorjé (Wylie: Lcang skya Rol pa'i Rdo rje) in the 18th century. While claimed to be a reconstruction of Zhitōng's text using a Tibetan version as a base, Changkya Rölpé Dorjé's text actually completely follows the Tibetan readings, with significant differences from Chödrup's version in a number of places, rather than Zhitōng's.

Others

A manuscript fragment  (currently in the  British Library) dating from around the 8th century containing the longer version of the dhāraṇī (Or.8212/175) in both late Brahmi and Sogdian scripts was discovered by Sir Aurel Stein in the Mogao Caves at Dunhuang and published by Robert Gauthiot and Louis de La Vallée-Poussin in 1912. The dhāraṇī's title is given in this manuscript as 1 LPw δsty ʾʾryʾβṛʾwkδʾyšβr nyṛknt nʾm tʾrny "the dhāraṇī of the names of Āryāvalokiteśvara-Nīlakaṇṭha with a thousand hands." The text shows a very close affinity to that found in Vajrabodhi's T. 1061 text. The dhāraṇī is followed by a short, unidentified mantra named wyspw ʾʾγδʾk δβrʾynʾk δrzyʾwr ptsrwm "hṛdaya mantra fulfilling all the wishes."

Background

Nīlakaṇṭha-lokeśvara 
According to author Lokesh Chandra (1988), the dhāraṇī in its original form was a recitation of the names of the deity (lokeśvara) Nīlakaṇṭha recited by the bodhisattva Avalokiteśvara: "Avalokiteśvara was responsible for introducing popular (loka) deities (iśvara) into the Buddhist pantheon by pronouncing their dhāraṇīs which averted evils to the person who obtained his wishes as soon as he recited it (paṭhita-siddhaḥ, Dutt: text 44)." In Vajrabodhi's longer version (T. 1061), the dhāraṇī is explicitly referred to as Āryāvalokiteśvara-bhāṣitaṃ "uttered (bhāṣita) by noble (ārya) Avalokiteśvara;" at this stage, Avalokiteśvara is portrayed as pronouncing the dhāraṇī, but is not (yet) identified with Nīlakaṇṭha.

As late as the 15th century, the tradition knew at least that Avalokiteśvara is the dhāraṇī's locutor, as is clear from a Chinese manual of the liturgical service of the thousand-armed Avalokiteśvara, presented to the Oriental scholar Samuel Beal by the monks of Hoi Tong Monastery (a.k.a. Hai Chwang Temple) on Henan Island.  Its preface, authored by the Ming emperor Yongle, says thus:

It is reported by Kwan Tseu Tsai Bodhisattva, prompted by her great compassionate heart has engaged herself by a great oath to enter into every one of the innumerable worlds, and bring deliverance to all creatures who inhabit them.
For this purpose she has enunciated the Divine sentences which follow, if properly recited, will render all creatures exempt from the causes of sorrow, and by removing them, render them capable of attaining Supreme Reason.

During the process of transmission, however, Nīlakaṇṭha became increasingly identified with Avalokiteśvara, so that the dhāraṇī eventually became understood as being addressed to Avalokiteśvara as Nīlakaṇṭha, now considered to be one of Avalokiteśvara's various forms or manifestations - most of whom were themselves originally folk deities who were assimilated into Avalokiteśvara upon being integrated into Buddhist belief and practice (e.g. Hayagriva, Cundi, Tara or Mazu; cf. also Shinbutsu-shūgō).

The dhāraṇī proper contains a number of titles associated with the Hindu gods Vishnu (e.g. Hare, Narasiṃha-mukha , gadā- / cakra- / padma-hastā 'the wielder of the mace / discus / lotus') and Shiva (e.g. Nīlakaṇṭha 'the blue-necked one', Śaṅkara, kṛṣṇa-sarpopavita 'the one who has a black serpent as a sacred thread'), suggesting that Nīlakaṇṭha was in origin Harihara - a fusion of Vishnu (Hari) and Shiva (Hara) - assimilated into Buddhism. This is more explicit in the longer version of the dhāraṇī, where Nīlakaṇṭha is invoked with more names and epithets associated with the two gods such as Tripūra-dahaneśvara 'the Lord (Īśvara) who destroyed / burnt down Tripūra' (Shiva) or Padmanābha 'lotus-naveled' (Vishnu), as well as a short description of the iconography of Nīlakaṇṭha Avalokiteśvara in Amoghavajra's version (T. 1111), which combines elements from depictions of Shiva and Vishnu.

 

The status of Shiva and Vishnu in the dhāraṇī follows a similar pattern to the one identified in the Kāraṇḍavyūha Sūtra (4th-5th century CE): the two gods are repeatedly invoked one after the other, indicating that they stand in a "complementary" relationship to each other. At the same time, however, Shiva is portrayed as the dominant of the two.

The thousand-armed Avalokiteśvara
The first of many images of the thousand-armed (sahasra-bhuja) Avalokiteśvara - a form of the bodhisattva that would subsequently become popular in East Asia - to appear in China was presented to the Tang Emperor by a monk from central India named Guptadeva(?) (瞿多提婆, pinyin: Qúduōtípó) somewhere between 618 and 626 CE. While as of yet, no trace of this iconographic depiction has been found within India itself, the depiction must have had an Indian origin: an image of this type was brought to China by an Indian monk, and all the Chinese texts on the thousand-handed Avalokiteśvara are translations from Sanskrit or Pali and contain Sanskrit hymns in transliteration. One possibility is that this form of Avalokiteśvara had its origins in Kashmir, whence the Kāraṇḍavyūha Sūtra may also have originated. From Kashmir, the "thousandfold" Avalokiteśvara might have spread northward, but not southward into the Indian mainland, which could explain the dearth of Indian artifacts connected to this depiction.

A thousand limbs are integral to the Indian tradition: the Puruṣa sūkta of the Ṛgveda, for instance, describes the cosmic man Puruṣa as having "a thousand heads ... a thousand eyes, a thousand feet." Notably, the Kāraṇḍavyūha Sūtra contains a Buddhist adaptation of the Vedic Puruṣa myth, with Avalokiteśvara as the all-pervasive cosmic being from whose body springs various gods:
"Āditya and Candra came from his eyes, Maheśvara came from his forehead, Brahmā came from his shoulders, Nārāyaṇa came from his heart, Devi Sarasvatī came from his canines, Vāyu came from his mouth, Dharaṇī came from his feet, and Varuṇa came from his stomach."

The epithets sahasra-bāhu ('thousand-armed') or sahasra-bhuja ('thousand-handed') commonly appear in Indian literature from the Ṛgveda onwards applied to various personages (e.g. Kartavirya Arjuna), including the gods Shiva and Vishnu. It has been suggested that the thousand arms of Avalokiteśvara is another example of an attribute of Shiva being assimilated into the bodhisattva, with the thousand arms being a symbol of the victory of Avalokiteśvara (and Buddhism) over Shiva, whose name 'Īśvara' he appropriates, and his cult. (Cf. Trailokyavijaya, one of the five Wisdom Kings, depicted as trampling on Maheśvara - the Buddhist version of Shiva - and his consort.) The thousand-armed Avalokiteśvara's eleven heads, meanwhile, are thought to be derived from the eleven Rudras, forms and companions of Shiva (Rudra).

Originally portrayed as a servant or acolyte of the buddha Amitābha in some of the texts which mention him, Avalokiteśvara - originally  'Avalokita(svara)' - also later came to be depicted as one who brought popular deities into Buddhism by pronouncing their hymns, thereby according them a place in Buddhist scriptures and ritual. Eventually, however, these deities came to be identified as different forms or manifestations of the bodhisattva himself. Thus Avalokiteśvara gradually took on forms, attributes and titles originally ascribed to Shiva and/or to Vishnu such as sahasra-bhuja, sahasra-netra ('thousand-eyed'), Īśvara, Maheśvara, Hari, or Nīlakaṇṭha.

The emergence of Avalokiteśvara's thousand-armed form is linked with the interiorisation of Shiva into the bodhisattva as Viśvarūpa. The dhāraṇī of 'Nīlakaṇṭha' (i.e. Harihara - Vishnu and Shiva - later conflated with Avalokiteśvara) became attached to the sahasra-bhuja Avalokiteśvara (of which Harihara was the prototype), so that the thousand-armed form became seen as a bestower of royal authority, a trait carried over from Nīlakaṇṭha/Harihara. Indeed, in Sri Lanka, Tibet and Southeast Asia, Avalokiteśvara became associated with the state and with royalty.

Classic Mahayana teaching holds that Avalokiteśvara is able to manifest in different forms according to the needs of different individuals. In the Lotus Sūtra, it is stated that Avalokiteśvara can appear in different guises - which includes that of 'Īśvara' and 'Maheśvara' - to teach the Dharma to various classes of beings.

The Buddha said to Bodhisattva Akṣayamati: "O son of a virtuous family! If there is any land where sentient beings are to be saved by the form of a buddha, Bodhisattva Avalokiteśvara teaches the Dharma by changing himself into the form of a buddha. ... To those who are to be saved by the form of Brahma, he teaches the Dharma by changing himself into the form of Brahma. To those who are to be saved by the form of Śakra, he teaches the Dharma by changing himself into the form of Śakra. To those who are to be saved by the form of Īśvara, he teaches the Dharma by changing himself into the form of Īśvara. To those who are to be saved in the form of Maheśvara, he teaches the Dharma by changing himself into the form of Maheśvara. ... To those who are to be saved by the form of a human or of a nonhuman such as a deva, nāga, yakṣa, gandharva, asura, garuḍa, kiṃnara, or mahoraga, he teaches the Dharma by changing himself into any of these forms."

A similar statement appears in the Kāraṇḍavyūha Sūtra:

Bhagavat Śikhin replied, 'He [Avalokiteśvara] completely ripens the many beings who circle in saṃsāra, teaches them the path to enlightenment, and teaches the Dharma in whatever form a being can be taught through. He teaches the Dharma in the form of a tathāgata to beings who are to be taught by a tathāgata. He teaches the Dharma in the form of a pratyekabuddha to beings who are to be taught by a pratyekabuddha. He teaches the Dharma in the form of an arhat to beings who are to be taught by an arhat. He teaches the Dharma in the form of a bodhisattva to beings who are to be taught by a bodhisattva. He teaches the Dharma in the form of Maheśvara to beings who are to be taught by Maheśvara. He teaches the Dharma in the form of Nārāyaṇa to beings who are to be taught by Nārāyaṇa. He teaches the Dharma in the form of Brahmā to beings who are to be taught by Brahmā. ... He teaches the Dharma in whatever particular form a being should be taught through. That, noble son, is how Bodhisattva Mahāsattva Avalokiteśvara completely ripens beings and teaches them the Dharma of nirvāṇa.'

Despite being a latecomer among the esoteric forms of Avalokiteśvara introduced into China, because of the promotion of his cult by the three esoteric masters (Śubhakarasiṃha, Vajrabodhi and Amoghavajra have all made translations of thousand-armed Avalokitesvara texts) and  patronage by the imperial court, the sahasra-bhuja Avalokitesvara overtook and absorbed the fame of other tantric forms of the bodhisattva.

Bhagavaddharma's version (T. 1060) and its popularity

Out of the various transliterations of the dhāraṇī in Chinese, that of Bhagavaddharma (T. 1060) has risen to become the standard in East Asia.

Bhagavaddharma was a monk who came to China from western India around the mid-7th century, about whom nothing else is known; the Taishō Tripitaka has only two works in Chinese by him, both on the thousand-armed Avalokiteśvara (T. 1059, 1060). The latter of these two works, the 'Sūtra of the Vast, Perfect, Unimpeded Great-Compassionate Heart of the Thousand-Handed Thousand-Eyed Bodhisattva Avalokitasvara's Dhāraṇī', made at Khotan around 650-661 CE, has made him immortal. The popularity of his version is attested by surviving Dunhuang manuscripts dated to the 8th century, some of which are excerpts of the ten great vows contained in the sūtra.

In China itself, various anecdotes about miracles effected by the recitation of the dhāraṇī appear from the Tang dynasty onwards. As the dhāraṇī's efficacy became widely known, dhāraṇī pillars on which the dhāraṇī's text was inscribed began to be erected, the earliest of these dating from 871 CE. By the end of the period, both the sūtra text and the dhāraṇī circulated among the monks and the laity, with copies being made either as pious offerings or commissioned by the faithful to obtain religious merit. An abbreviated version of the sūtra, consisting of only the ten great vows recited by Avalokiteśvara within the text (see 'Summary' below) and the dhāraṇī itself, was also in circulation. Known as the 'Invocation of the Great Compassionate One' (大悲啟請 Dàbēi qǐqǐng), this text was probably used in a liturgical setting.

The reason behind the subsequent popularity of Bhagavaddharma's sūtra is thought to be due to its relative simplicity compared to other versions: while other sūtras on the thousand-armed Avalokiteśvara contained detailed rules on how to visualize and depict this form of the bodhisattva, the very lack of such instructions in Bhagavaddharma's text might have contributed to its democratic appeal for ordinary people. In addition, Bhagavaddharma's version is the only one that contained the sections on the ten great vows and the blessing of the fifteen kinds of good deaths as well as protection from fifteen kinds of bad deaths. The dhāraṇī's concrete power over death and the comprehensiveness of Avalokiteśvara's vows might have been another factor that appealed to the masses.

Because of the great popularity enjoyed by this sūtra, the epithet 'Great Compassionate One' (大悲 Dàbēi) became identified specifically with the sahasra-bhuja Avalokiteśvara from the Tang period on, though previously it was used in other sūtras to describe Avalokiteśvara in general.

Summary of Bhagavaddharma's version

Bhagavaddharma's text begins with Śākyamuni Buddha in Avalokiteśvara's palace on the island Potalaka about to preach to a congregation of bodhisattvas, arhats, devas and other beings. Suddenly there is a great illumination and the three thousand realms become golden in color, shaking all over while the sun and moon become dull by comparison. One of the bodhisattvas present, Dhāraṇī King (總持王菩薩), asks the Buddha why this is happening; the Buddha reveals that Avalokiteśvara secretly emitted this light "in order to comfort and please all living-beings."

Avalokiteśvara then begins to speak, revealing that innumerable kalpas ago, the Thousand-light King Tathāgata of Tranquil Abode (千光王靜住如來) entrusted to him the 'Dhāraṇī of the Great Compassionate Heart' (大悲心陀羅尼呪). As soon as he heard the dhāraṇī, Avalokiteśvara - who had then been a bodhisattva of the first stage - quickly advanced to the eighth stage, and after reciting a vow, became endowed with a thousand hands and eyes: "So from that epoch long ago, I have kept the dhāraṇī. As a result, I have always been born where there is a buddha. Moreover, I have never undergone birth from a womb, but am always transformed from a lotus."

After giving this explanation, he then calls upon anyone who wants to keep this dhāraṇī to give rise to the thought of compassion for all sentient beings by making the following ten vows after him.

Namaḥ Avalokiteśvara of Great Compassion, may I quickly learn all Dharma.
Namaḥ Avalokiteśvara of Great Compassion, may I speedily obtain the eye of wisdom.
Namaḥ Avalokiteśvara of Great Compassion, may I quickly save all sentient beings.
Namaḥ Avalokiteśvara of Great Compassion, may I speedily obtain skillful means.
Namaḥ Avalokiteśvara of Great Compassion, may I quickly sail on the prajñā boat.
Namaḥ Avalokiteśvara of Great Compassion, may I speedily cross over the ocean of suffering.
Namaḥ Avalokiteśvara of Great Compassion, may I quickly obtain the way of discipline and meditation.
Namaḥ Avalokiteśvara of Great Compassion, may I speedily ascend the nirvāṇa mountain.
Namaḥ Avalokiteśvara of Great Compassion, may I quickly enter the house of non-action.
Namaḥ Avalokiteśvara of Great Compassion, may I speedily achieve the Dharma-Body.
If I face a mountain of knives, may it naturally crumble, if I face a roaring fire, may it naturally burn out, if I face hell, may it naturally disappear, if I face a hungry ghost, may it naturally be satiated, if I face an Asura, may its evil heart gradually become tame and, if I face an animal, may it naturally obtain great wisdom.

After making such vows, one should then sincerely call the name of Avalokiteśvara as well as the name of Amitābha Buddha, Avalokiteśvara's original teacher.

Avalokiteśvara stresses the dhāraṇī's efficacy by vowing that should anyone who recites it fall into an evil realm of rebirth, or not be born into one of the buddha lands, or not attain unlimited samādhi and eloquence, or not get whatever he desires in his present life, or, in the case of a woman, if she detests the female body and wants to become a man, he (Avalokiteśvara) will not achieve complete, perfect enlightenment, unless those who recited it were insincere, in which case they will not reap its benefits.

Aside from such spiritual and mundane benefits as removing grave sins caused by heinous acts such as the five crimes or the ten evil acts or curing 84,000 kinds of illnesses, the sincere keeping of the dhāraṇī is said to also result in fifteen kinds of good rebirth (e.g. being ruled by a virtuous king wherever one is born, fully endowed with money and food, can see the Buddha and listen to the Dharma in the place of birth) and the avoidance of fifteen kinds of evil deaths (e.g. suicide, death on the battlefield, death by starvation).

Avalokiteśvara then recites the dhāraṇī; the earth shakes in six ways, while precious flowers rain down from the sky. As all the buddhas of the ten directions are delighted and practitioners of heterodox ways become frightened, all the assembled reach different levels of realization. Upon being asked by Mahābrahmā (大梵天王), Avalokiteśvara goes on to further explain the dhāraṇī's benefits, both spiritual and temporal, and recites a gāthā commanding various benevolent devas, nāgas and yakṣas to guard the keepers of the dhāraṇī.

Like all esoteric sūtras, this sūtra shows interest in ritual matters. As part of the sādhanā or ritual requirement, detailed instructions on constructing a sacred space or boundary are provided: the dhāraṇī is to be recited twenty-one times over a particular item such as a knife, pure water, white mustard seed, clean ashes, or five colored twine, which would then be used to demarcate the boundary. The sūtra also offers many recipes employing the dhāraṇī to deal with various mundane problems (e.g. to ease a difficult childbirth or to cure scotophobia or snakebite) or to attain specific goals (e.g. commanding a ghost or the four guardian gods, repelling foreign invasions or natural disasters away from one's own country).

The sūtra then ends by identifying the names of the forty mudrās of the thousand-armed Avalokiteśvara - forty standing for the full number of a thousand - and the respective benefits they bestow on the worshipper. These mudrās are only described verbally on Bhagavaddharma's version; illustrated depictions are found in the version by Amoghavajra (T. 1064).

In Buddhist practice
The Nīlakaṇṭha dhāraṇī, now firmly associated with the sahasra-bhuja form of Avalokiteśvara, enjoys a huge popularity in East Asian Mahayana Buddhism.

The dhāraṇī is especially revered in China, where the thousand-armed Avalokiteśvara (or Guanyin) is the most popular among the bodhisattva's forms. It is most often called the 'Great Compassion Mantra' (大悲咒 Dàbēi zhòu) in popular parlance, an epithet also (mistakenly) applied to a different, much shorter dhāraṇī, that of the Eleven-headed (Ekadasa-mukha) Avalokiteśvara. Musical renditions of this latter dhāraṇī (such as those made by Imee Ooi or Ani Choying Dolma) are often labelled the Tibetan Great Compassion Mantra (traditional: 藏傳大悲咒, simplified: 藏传大悲咒 Zàngchuán Dàbēi zhòu) or The Great Compassion Mantra in Sanskrit (梵音大悲咒 Fànyīn Dàbēi zhòu) in recordings, adding to the confusion.

In Korea, the dhāraṇī - usually referred to as Sinmyo janggu daedalani (신묘장구대다라니; Hanja: 神妙章句大陀羅尼 "The Great Dhāraṇī of Wondrous Verses") or as Cheon-su gyeong (천수경; Hanja: 千手經 "Thousand Hands Sutra") - is also a regular fixture of Buddhist ritual. Copies of the dhāraṇī (written in Hangul and the Korean variant of Siddhaṃ script) are hung inside homes to bring auspiciousness.

In Japan, the dhāraṇī is most often associated with the Zen schools of Buddhism such as Sōtō (where it is called 大悲心陀羅尼 Daihishin darani "Dhāraṇī of the Great Compassionate Heart") or Rinzai (which dubs the dhāraṇī 大悲円満無礙神呪 Daihi Enman Muge (or Enmon Bukai) Jinshu "Divine Mantra of the Vast, Perfect Great Compassion" or 大悲呪 Daihi shu - the Japanese reading of Dàbēi zhòu), where it is extensively used: as in many other parts of East Asia, it is chanted daily by Zen monks, and used in funerals as well as in hungry ghost feeding ceremonies (segaki).

A version of the dhāraṇī is also found within the esoteric Shingon school: in the early 20th century it was apparently counted as one of three dhāraṇīs (三陀羅尼 san darani) especially revered within the school, the other two being the Buddhoṣṇīṣa Vijaya Dhāraṇī (仏頂尊勝陀羅尼 Bucchō-sonshō darani) and the Guhyadhātu Karaṇḍa-mudrā Dhāraṇī (宝篋印陀羅尼 Hōkyō-in darani). Since then, however, the Root Dhāraṇī of Amitābha (阿弥陀如来根本陀羅尼 Amida nyorai konpon darani) - once counted as an alternative candidate to the Nīlakaṇṭha dhāraṇī - seems to have overtaken its place.

In Vietnam, the dhāraṇī is called Chú Đại Bi (the Vietnamese translation of the Chinese title  大悲咒 Dàbēi zhòu), It is almost similar to the version of Bhagavaddharma, albeit with a different way of dividing the text (84 verses instead of 82). The text is available in two forms: either without the verse numbering, or with verse numbering (1-84). At the entrance of many pagodas, especially in tourist places, the Chú Đại Bi  is made available to visitors, either printed on a single sheet in black and white, or as a color booklet on glossy paper. They are printed on the initiative of Buddhist practitioners who make an offering to the sangha.

Texts and translations

Shorter version

Besides some differences in dividing the text and a few (very minor) variances in wording, the Chinese, Vietnamese and Japanese versions of the dhāraṇī are substantially the same, being based either on the short version by Bhagavaddharma (T. 1060) and/or a similar rendition by Amoghavajra (T. 1113b).

Bhagavaddharma (Taishō Tripiṭaka 1060)

Bhagavaddharma's rendition of the dhāraṇī into Chinese characters are as follows:

Amoghavajra (Taishō Tripiṭaka 1113b)

The following is a version of the dhāraṇī attributed to Amoghavajra (T. 1113b) which is mostly similar to that of Bhagavaddharma, albeit with a different way of dividing the text and an accompanying Sanskrit version written in Siddhaṃ script (Romanized; Sanskrit transliterated as written in the original).

na mo ra tna tra yā ya / 南 無喝 囉 怛那 哆羅 夜 㖿(一)
na ma ā ryā / 南 無 阿 唎㖿(二)
va lo ki te śva rā ya / 婆 盧 羯 帝 爍鉢 囉 㖿(三)
bo dhi sa tvā ya / 菩 提 薩 哆婆 㖿(四)
ma hā sa tvā ya / 摩 訶 薩 埵婆 㖿(五)
ma hā kā ru ṇi kā ya / 摩 訶 迦 嚧 昵 迦 㖿(六)
oṃ　唵(七)
sa rva ra bha ye / 薩 皤 囉 罰 曳(八)
ṣu dha na da sya / 數 怛 那 怛 寫(九)
na mo skṛ ta ī mo ā ryā / 南 無 悉吉㗚 埵 伊 蒙 阿 唎耶(十)
ba ru ki te śi va raṃ dha va / 婆 嚧 吉 帝 室 佛 楞 馱 婆(十一)
na mo na ra ki dhi / 南 無 那 囉 謹 墀(十二)
he ri ma va dha ṣa me / 醯 唎 摩 皤 哆 沙 咩(十三)
sa rva a tha du śu tuṃ / 薩 婆 阿 陀 頭 輸 朋(十四)　
a je yaṃ / 阿 遊 孕(十五)
sa rva bhu ta na ma va ga / 薩 婆 菩 哆 那 摩 縛 伽(十六)
ma va du du / 摩 罰 特 豆(十七)
ta dya thā oṃ / 怛 姪 他(十八) 唵
a va lo ka lo kā te / 阿 波 盧 醯 盧 迦 帝(十九)
ka ra te / 迦 羅 帝(二十)
e hṛe / 夷 醯唎(二十一)
ma hā bo dhi sa tva sa rva2 / 摩 訶 菩 薩 埵(二十二) 薩 婆 薩 婆(二十三)
ma la2 ma ma hṛe da yaṃ / 摩 囉 摩 囉 摩 摩 醯唎 馱 孕(二十四)
ku ru2 ka rmaṃ / 俱 嚧 俱 嚧 羯 懞(二十五)
dhu ru2 va ja ya te / 度 嚧 度 嚧 罰 闍 耶 帝(二十六)
ma hā va ja ya te / 摩 訶 罰 闍 耶 帝(二十七)
dha ra2 / 陀 羅 陀 羅(二十八)
dhi ri ṇi / 地 利 尼(二十九)
rā ya / 囉 耶(三十)
ca la ca la / 遮 羅 遮 羅(三十一)
ma ma / 摩 摩(弟子某甲受持)
va ma ra / 罰 摩 羅(三十二)
su kte le / 穆 帝 曬(三十三)
e he e he / 伊 醯 移 醯(三十四)
ci nda2 / 室 那 室 那(三十五)
ar ṣam pra ca li / 阿 囉參 佛囉 舍 利(三十六)
va ṣa va ṣaṃ pra śa ya / 罰 沙 罰 參 佛羅 舍 耶(三十七)
hu ru2 ma ra / 呼 嚧 呼 嚧 麼 囉(三十八)
hu ru2 / 呼 嚧 醯利(三十九)
sa ra2 / 沙 囉 沙 囉(四十)
si ri2 su ru2 / 悉 唎 悉 唎(四十一) 蘇 嚧 蘇 嚧(四十二)
bo dhi ya2 / 菩 提 㖿 菩 提 㖿(四十三)
bo dha ya2 / 菩 提 耶 菩 提 耶(四十四)
mai tri ya / 彌 帝唎 耶(四十五)
na ra ki ndi / 那 囉 謹 墀(四十六)
dha rṣi ṇi na pa ṣa ma na / 地 唎瑟 尼 那 波 夜 摩 那(四十七)
svā hā si ddhā ya / 娑婆 訶(四十八) 悉 陀 夜(四十九)
svā hā ma hā si ddhā ya svā hā / 娑婆 訶(五十法語) / 摩 訶 悉 陀 夜 娑婆 訶
si ddha yo ge / 悉 陀 喩 藝(五十二)
śva ka rā ya svā hā / 室皤伽 囉 耶 娑婆 訶(五十三)
na ra ki ndi svā hā ma ra na ra / 那 囉 謹 墀(五十五) 娑婆 訶(五十六) 摩 囉 那 囉(五十七)
svā hā / 娑婆 訶(五十八)
si ra saṃ ha mu khā ya / 悉 囉 僧 阿 穆 佉 耶(五十九)
svā hā pa ma hā si ddhā ya / 娑婆 訶(六十) 婆 摩 訶 悉 陀 夜(六十一)
svā hā ca kra si ddhā ya / 娑婆 訶(六十二) 者 吉囉阿 悉 陀 夜(六十三)
svā hā / 娑婆 訶(六十四)
pa dma ka stā ya / 婆 摩 羯 悉哆 夜(六十五)
svā hā / 娑婆 訶(六十六)
na ra ki ndi va ga ra ya svā hā / 那 囉 謹 墀 皤 迦 囉 夜(六十七) 娑婆 訶(六十八)
ma va ri śa nka ya svā hā / 摩 婆 唎 勝 羯 夜(六十九) 娑婆 訶(七十)
na mo ra tna tra yā ya / 南 無喝 囉 怛 那 多 囉 夜 耶(七十一)
na mo ā ryā va lo ki te śva / 南 無 阿 唎㖿(七十二) 婆 嚧 吉 帝(七十三) 爍皤
rā ya bo dhi svā hā / 囉 夜(七十四) 菩 提 娑婆 訶

Analysis

While the most commonly used version in East Asia, the shorter version of the dhāraṇī as transcribed by Bhagavaddharma has been criticized as an imperfect rendering based on a defective recitation or manuscript copy. Amoghavajra's Siddhaṃ text in T. 1113b is also badly corrupted. In addition to the use of the Central Asian form 'Narakindi'/'Nilakandi'/'Narakidhi' (那囉謹墀) for Sanskrit Nīlakaṇṭha and other grammatical quirks which betray a Central Asian milieu, certain other portions of the standard text are corrupt beyond recognition.

For instance, the passage 室那室那 阿囉嘇佛囉舍利 (Siddhaṃ text of T. 1113b: cinda 2 arṣam pracali), is thought to be a corruption of kṛṣṇa-sarpopavīta "thou with the black serpent as the sacred thread" (attested in other versions and hinted in Amoghavajra's commentary in T. 1111), with the word for 'serpent' (सर्प sarpa) as written in Siddhaṃ script being misread as 2 arsa. Meanwhile, 薩婆菩哆那摩縛伽摩罰特豆 (T. 1113b: sarva-bhutanama vagama vadudu) is a misrendering of sarva-bhūtānām bhava-mārga visodhakam ("(it) cleanses the path of existence of all beings"), with dudu (特豆) being a filler word to cover a portion of the text that was not perceived clearly.

Reconstructed Sanskrit text

The following is a reconstruction of the original Sanskrit text of Bhagavaddharma's version by Chandra (1988) based on a comparison with other versions; his own translation of this text is given below.

Namo ratna trayāya | namo āryĀvalokiteśvarāya bodhisattvāya mahāsattvāya mahākāruṇikāya |
Oṃ sarva-bhayeṣu trāṇa-karāya tasya namaskṛtvā imaṃ āryĀvalokiteśvara-stavanaṃ Nīlakaṇṭha-nāma |
Hṛdayaṃ vartayiṣyāmi sarv-ārtha-sādhanaṃ śubhaṃ |
ajeyaṃ sarva-bhūtānāṃ bhava-mārga -viśodhakam ||
TADYATHĀ | Oṃ apaloka lokātikrānta ehi Hare mahābodhisattva sarpa-sarpa | smara smara mama hṛdayam | kuru-kuru karma | dhuru-dhuru vijayate mahāvijayate | dhara-dhara dharāṇi-rāja | cala-cala mama vimala-mūrtte re | ehy-ehi kṛṣṇa-sarp-opavīta | viṣa-viṣaṃ praṇāśaya | hulu-hulu malla | hulu-hulu Hare | sara-sara siri-siri suru-suru | bodhiya-bodhiya bodhaya-bodhaya maitriya Nīlakaṇṭha | darśanena prahlādaya manaḥ svāhā |
siddhāya svāhā | mahāsiddhāya svāhā | siddha-yogeśvarāya svāhā | Nīlakaṇṭhāya svāhā | Vāraha-mukhāya svāhā | Narasiṃha-mukhāya svāhā | padma-hastāya svāhā | cakra-hastāya svāhā | padma-hastāya? svāhā | Nīlakaṇṭha-vyāghrāya svāhā | Mahābali-Śankarāya svāhā ||
Namo ratna-trayāya | namo āryĀvalokiteśvarāya svāhā ||
(Oṃ siddhyantu mantra-padāni svāhā ||)

Chinese version

The form of the dhāraṇī as commonly written and recited in Chinese Buddhism is as follows. The Chinese characters are a transcription, not a translation, of the Sanskrit. For example, in the first line 喝囉怛那·哆囉夜耶 hē luō dá nà · duō luō yè yé transliterates the Sanskrit ratna-trayāya (three treasures) but "three treasures" would be translated as 三寶 sān bǎo.

Vietnamese version
The dhāraṇī in Vietnamese (here given without verse numbering) is as follows:
 
Nam mô hắc ra đát na đa ra dạ da. Nam mô a rị da, bà lô yết đế, thước bác ra da, bồ đề tát đỏa bà da, ma ha tát đỏa bà da, ma ha ca lô ni ca da. Án tát bàn ra phạt duệ, số đát na  đá tỏa.
Nam mô tất kiết lật đỏa, y mông a rị da bà lô kiết đế, thất phật ra lăng đà bà.Nam mô na ra cẩn trì hế rị, ma ha bàn đá sa mế, tát bà a tha đậu du bằng a thể dựng, tát bà tát đa, na ma bà gìa ma phạt đạt đậu, đát thiệt tha. Án, a bà lô hê, lô ca đế, ca ra đế, di hê rị, ma ha bồ đề tát đỏa, tát bà tát bà, ma ra ma ra, ma hê ma hê, rị đàn dựng cu lô cu lô kiết mông độ lô độ lô, phạt xà da đế, ma ha phạt xà da đế, đà ra đà ra, địa rị ni, thất Phật ra da, dá ra dá ra. Mạ mạ phạt ma ra, mục đế lệ, y hê y hê, thất na thất na, a ra sâm Phật ra xá lợi, phạt sa phạt sâm, Phật ra xá da, hô lô hô lô ma ra, hô lô hô lô hê rị, ta ra ta ra, tất rị tất rị, tô rô tô rô bồ đề dạ, bồ đề dạ, bồ đà dạ, bồ đà dạ, di đế rị dạ, na ra cẩn trì địa rị sắc ni na, ba dạ ma na ta bà ha. Tất đà dạ ta bà ha. Ma ha tất đà dạ ta bà ha. Tất đà du nghệ thất bàn ra dạ ta bà ha. Na ra cẩn trì. Ta bà ha. Ma ra na ra. Ta bà ha.  Tất ra tăng a mục khê da, ta bà ha. Ta bà ma ha a tất đà dạ ta bà ha. Gỉa kiết ra a tất đà dạ ta bà ha. Ba đà ma yết tất đà dạ, ta bà ha. Na ra cẩn trì bàn dà ra dạ ta bà ha. Ma bà lị thắng yết ra dạ ta bà ha.
Nam mô hắc ra đát na đá ra mạ da, Nam mô a rị da bà lô yết đế, thước bàn ra dạ, ta bà ha. Án tất điện đô, mạn đa ra, bạt đà dạ, ta bà ha.

Japanese: Sōtō Zen version

The following is the dhāraṇī as written and recited within the Sōtō school of Japanese Zen Buddhism.

(Kanji)
南無喝囉怛那。哆羅夜耶。南無阿唎耶。婆盧羯帝。爍盋囉耶。菩提薩埵婆耶。摩訶薩埵婆耶。摩訶迦盧尼迦耶。唵。薩皤囉罰曳数怛那怛写。南無悉吉利埵伊蒙阿唎耶。婆盧吉帝室仏囉楞馱婆。南無那囉。謹墀醯唎。摩訶皤哷。沙咩薩婆。阿他豆輸朋。阿逝孕。薩婆薩哷。那摩婆伽。摩罰特豆。怛姪他。唵。阿婆盧醯。盧迦帝。迦羅帝。夷醯唎。摩訶菩提薩埵。薩婆薩婆。摩囉摩囉。摩醯摩醯唎馱孕。俱盧俱盧羯蒙。度盧度盧罰闍耶帝。摩訶罰闍耶帝。陀囉陀囉。地利尼。室仏囉耶。遮囉遮囉。摩摩罰摩囉。穆帝隷。伊醯伊醯。室那室那。阿囉参仏囉舎利。罰沙罰参。仏囉舎耶。呼盧呼盧摩囉。呼盧呼盧醯利。娑囉娑囉。悉利悉利。蘇嚧蘇嚧。菩提夜菩提夜。菩駄夜菩駄夜。弥帝唎夜。那囉謹墀。地利瑟尼那。婆夜摩那。娑婆訶。悉陀夜。娑婆訶。摩訶悉陀夜。娑婆訶。悉陀喻芸。室皤囉夜。娑婆訶。那囉謹墀。娑婆訶。摩囉那囉娑婆訶。悉囉僧阿穆佉耶。娑婆訶。娑婆摩訶悉陀夜。娑婆訶。者吉囉阿悉陀夜。娑婆訶。波陀摩羯悉陀夜。娑婆訶。那囉謹墀皤伽囉耶。娑婆訶。摩婆唎勝羯囉耶娑婆訶。
南無喝囉怛那哆羅夜耶。南無阿唎耶。婆盧吉帝。爍皤囉耶。娑婆訶。悉殿都漫哆囉。跋陀耶。娑婆訶。

(Hiragana)
なむからたんのう。とらやーやー。なむおりやー。ぼりょきーちー。しふらーやー。ふじさとぼーやー。もこさとぼーやー。もーこーきゃーるにきゃーやー。えん。さーはらはーえーしゅーたんのうとんしゃー。なむしきりーといもー。おりやー。ぼりょきーちー。しふらー。りんとうぼー。なむのーらー。きんじーきーりー。もーこーほーどー。しゃーみーさーぼー。おーとうじょーしゅーべん。おーしゅーいん。さーぼーさーとー。のーもーぼーぎゃー。もーはーてーちょー。とーじーとー。えん。おーぼーりょーきー。るーぎゃーちー。きゃーらーちー。いーきりもーこー。ふじさーとー。さーぼーさーぼー。もーらーもーらー。もーきーもーきー。りーとーいんくーりょーくーりょー。けーもーとーりょーとーりょー。ほーじゃーやーちー。もーこーほーじゃーやーちー。とーらーとーらー。ちりにー。しふらーやー。しゃーろーしゃーろー。もーもーはーも－らー。ほーちーりー。いーきーいーきー。しーのーしーのー。おらさんふらしゃーりー。はーざーはーざん。ふらしゃーやー。くーりょーくーりょー。もーらーくーりょーくーりょー。きーりーしゃーろーしゃーろー。しーりーしーりー。すーりょーすーりょー。ふじやー。ふじやー。ふどやーふどやー。みーちりやー。のらきんじー。ちりしゅにのー。ほやもの。そもこー。しどやー。そもこー。もこしどやー。そもこー。しどゆーきー。しふらーやー。そもこー。のらきんじー。そもこー。もーらーのーらーそもこー。しらすーおもぎゃーやー。そもこー。そぼもこしどやー。そもこー。しゃきらーおしどーやー。そもこー。ほどもぎゃしどやー。そもこー。のらきんじーはーぎゃらやー。そもこー。もーほりしんぎゃらやーそもこー。
なむからたんのうとらやーやー。なむおりやー。ぼりょきーちーしふらーやー。そもこー。してどーもどらー。ほどやー。そーもーこー。

(Romaji)
Namu karatannō. Torayāyā. Namu oriyā. Boryokīchī. Shifurāyā. Fujisatobōyā. Mokosatobōyā. Mōkō kyārunikyāyā. En. Sāharahāē shūtannō tonshā. Namu shikirī toimō. Oriyā. Boryokīchī shifurā. Rintōbō. Namu nōrā. Kinjī kīrī. Mōkō hōdō. Shāmī sābō. Ōtō jōshūben. Ōshūin. Sābō sātō. Nōmō bōgyā. Mōhā tēchō. Tōjītō. En. Ōboryōkī. Rūgyāchī. Kyārāchī. Īkiri mōkō. Fujisātō. Sābō sābō. Mōrā mōrā. Mōkī mōkī. Rītōin kūryō kūryō. Kēmō tōryō tōryō. Hōjāyāchī. Mōkōhōjāyāchī. Tōrā tōrā. Chirinī shifurāyā. Shārō shārō. Mōmōhāmōrā. Hōchīrī. Īkī Īkī. Shīnō shīnō. Orasan furashārī. Hāzā hāzān. Furashāyā. Kūryō kūryō. Mōrā kūryō kūryō. Kīrī shārō shārō. Shīrī shīrī. Sūryō sūryō. Fujiyā fujiyā. Fudoyā fudoyā. Mīchiriyā. Norakinjī. Chiri shuninō. Hoyamono. Somokō. Shidoyā. Somokō. Mokoshidoyā. Somokō. Shidoyūkī. Shifurāyā. Somokō. Norakinjī. Somokō. Mōrānōrā somokō. Shirasū omogyāyā. Somokō. Sobomoko shidoyā. Somokō. Shakirā oshidōyā. Somokō. Hodomo gyashidoyā. Somokō. Norakinjī hāgyarayā. Somokō. Mōhori shingyarayā somokō. 
Namu karatannō torayāyā. Namu oriyā boryokīchī shifurāyā. Somokō. Shitedō modorā. Hodoyā. Sōmōkō.

Japanese: Shingon version

A form of the dhāraṇī which uses a pronunciation scheme different from that used by the Zen schools is attested within Shingon Buddhism.

(Hiragana)
のうぼう。あらたんのうたらやあや。のうぼありや。ばろきてい。じんばらや。ぼうじさとばや。まかさとばや。まかきゃろにきゃや。おんさらばらばえいしゅ。たんのうだしや。のうぼう。そきりたばいもうありや。ばろきてい。じんばらりょうだば。のうぼう。ならきんじ。けいりまばたしゃめい。さらばあたづしゅぼう。あせいよう。さらばぼたのう。まばばぎゃ。まばどづ。
たにゃた。おんあばろけいろきゃてい。きゃらてい。いけいりまかぼうじさとば。さらばさらば。まらまら。まま。けいりだよう。くろくろきゃらぼう。どろどろ。ばじゃやてい。まかばじゃやてい。だらだら。ちりにじんばらや。しゃらしゃら。まま。ばつまら。ぼくていれい。いけいいけい。しっだしっだ。あらさんはらしゃり。ばしゃばさん。はらしゃや。ころころ。まら。ころけいり。さらさら。しりしり。そろそろ。ぼうじやぼうじや。ぼうだやぼうだや。みていりや。ならきんじ。だりしゅにのう。はやまのう。そわか。しつだや。そわか。まかしつだや。そわか。しつだゆけい。じんばらや。そわか。ならきんじ。そわか。まらならしつら。そわか。ぼきゃや。そわか。はまかしつだや。そわか。しゃきゃらあしつだや。そわか。
はんどまきゃしつだや。そわか。ならきんじ。ばぎゃらや。そわか。まばりしょうぎゃらや。そわか。
のうぼう。あらたんのう。たらやあや。のうぼうありや。ばろきてい。じんばらや。そわか。

(Romaji)
Nōbō. Aratannō tarayāya. Nōbo ariya. Barokitei. Jinbaraya. Bōjisatobaya. Makasatobaya. Makakyaronikyaya. On sarabarabaeishu. Tannō dashiya. Nōbō. Sokiri taba imō ariya. Barokitei. Jinbara ryōdaba. Nōbō. Narakinji. Keiri mabata shamei. Saraba atazu shubō. Aseiyō. Saraba botanō. Maba bagya. maba dozu.
Tanyata. On abarokei rokyatei. Kyaratei. Ikeiri makabōjisatoba. Saraba saraba. Mara mara. Mama. Keiridayō. Kuro kuro kyarabō. Doro doro. Bajayatei. Makabajayatei. Dara dara. Chirini jinbaraya. Shara shara. Mama. Batsumara. Bokuteirei. Ikei ikei. Shidda shidda. Arasan harashari. Basha basan. Harashaya. Koro koro. Mara. Koro keiri. Sara sara. Shiri shiri. Soro soro. Bōjiya bōjiya. Bōdaya bōdaya. Miteiriya. Narakinji. Darishuninō. Hayamanō. Sowaka. Shitsudaya. Sowaka. Makashitsudaya. Sowaka. Shitsudayukei. Jinbaraya. Sowaka. Narakinji. Sowaka. Maranara shitsura. Sowaka. Bokyaya. Sowaka. Hamaka shitsudaya. Sowaka. Shakyarā shitsudaya. Sowaka. Handomakya shitsudaya. Sowaka. Narakinji. Bagyaraya. Sowaka. Mabari shōgyaraya. Sowaka.
Nōbō. Aratannō. Tarayāya. Nōbō Ariyabarokitei. Jinbaraya. Sowaka.

English translations

D.T. Suzuki

Author D.T. Suzuki's English translation of the standard version is as follows:

Adoration to the Triple Treasure!
Adoration to Avalokiteśvara the Bodhisattva-Mahāsattva who is the great compassionate one!
Om, to the one who performs a leap beyond all fears!
Having adored him, may I enter into the heart of the blue-necked one known as the noble adorable Avalokiteśvara! It means the completing of all meaning, it is pure, it is that which makes all beings victorious and cleanses the path of existence.
Thus:
Om, the seer, the world-transcending one!
O Hari the Mahābodhisattva!
All, all!
Defilement, defilement!
The earth, the earth!
It is the heart.
Do, do the work!
Hold fast, hold fast! O great victor!
Hold on, hold on! I hold on.
To Indra the creator!
Move, move, my defilement-free seal!
Come, come!
Hear, hear!
A joy springs up in me!
Speak, speak! Directing!
Hulu, hulu, mala, hulu, hulu, hile!
Sara, sara! siri, siri! suru, suru!
Be awakened, be awakened!
Have awakened, have awakened!
O merciful one, blue-necked one!
Of daring ones, to the joyous, hail!
To the successful one, hail!
To the great successful one, hail!
To the one who has attained master in the discipline, hail!
To the blue-necked one, hail!
To the boar-faced one, hail!
To the one with a lion's head and face, hail!
To the one who holds a weapon in his hand, hail!
To the one who holds a wheel in his hand, hail!
To the one who holds a lotus in his hand, hail!
To the blue-necked far-causing one, hail!
To the beneficient one referred to in this Dhāraṇī beginning with "Namaḥ," hail!
Adoration to the Triple Treasure!
Adoration to Avalokiteśvara!
Hail!
May these [prayers] be successful!
To this magical formula, hail!

Kazuaki Tanahashi and Joan Halifax

A rendition of the dhāraṇī by Joan Halifax and Kazuaki Tanahashi, based on interpretations by Japanese authors Shūyō Takubo (1960) and Tomoyasu Takenaka (1998), is as follows:

Homage to the Three Treasures. Homage to noble Avalokitesvara, noble Bodhisattva Mahasattva, who embodies great compassion. Om. Homage to you, who protects all those who are fearful.
Being one with you, the Blue-necked noble Avalokitesvara, I bring forth your radiant heart that grants all wishes, overcomes obstacles, and purifies delusion.
Here is the mantra: Om. You are luminous with shining wisdom. You transcend the world. O, Lion King, great Bodhisattva. Remember, remember, this heart. Act, act. Realize, realize. Continue, continue. Victor, great victor. Maintain, maintain. Embodiment of freedom. Arise, arise, the immaculate one, the undefiled being. Advance, advance. You are supreme on this earth. You remove the harm of greed. You remove the harm of hatred. You remove the harm of delusion. Lion King, remove, remove all defilements. The universal lotus grows from your navel. Act, act. Cease, cease. Flow, flow. Awake, awake. Compassionate one, enlighten, enlighten.
Blue-necked One, you bring joy to those who wish to see clearly. Svaha. You succeed. Svaha. You greatly succeed. Svaha. You have mastered the practice. Svaha. Blue-necked one. Svaha. Boar-faced one, lion-faced one. Svaha. You hold the lotus. Svaha. You hold the blade wheel. Svaha. You liberate through the sound of the conch.  Svaha. You hold a great staff. Svaha. You are the dark conqueror abiding near the left shoulder. Svaha. You wear a tiger skin. Svaha. 
Homage to the Three Treasures. Homage to noble Avalokiteshvara. Svaha. Realize all the phrases of this mantra. Svaha.

Lokesh Chandra

Chandra (1988) criticized both Suzuki's translation and his characterization of dhāraṇīs as "[conveying] no intelligent signification ... mostly consist[ing] of invocations and exclamations" and provided an alternative translation - a corrected version of an earlier translation by the same author (1979) - based on his reconstruction of the text (see 'Reconstructed Sanskrit text' above).

1. Adoration to the Triple Gem. Adoration to ārya Avalokiteśvarā, bodhisattva, mahāsattva, the Great Compassionate One. Oṃ. Having paid adoration to One who protects in all dangers, here is the [recitation] of the names of Nīlakaṇṭha, as chanted by ārya Avalokiteśvarā.
2. I shall enunciate the 'heart' [dhāraṇī] which ensures all aims, is pure and invincible for all beings, and which purifies the path of existence.
3. THUS. Oṃ. O Effulgence, World-Transcendent, come, oh Hari, the great bodhisattva, descend, descend. Bear in mind my heart-dhāraṇī. Accomplish, accomplish the work. Hold fast, hold fast, Victor, oh Great Victor. Hold on, hold on, oh Lord of the Earth. Move, move, oh my Immaculate Image. Come, come, Thou with the black serpent as Thy sacred thread. Destroy every poison. Quick, quick, oh Strong Being. Quick, Quick, oh Hari. Descend, descend, come down, come down, condescend, condescend. Being enlightened enlighten me, oh merciful Nīlakaṇṭha. Gladden my heart by appearing unto me.
To the Siddha hail. To the Great Siddha hail. To the Lord of Siddha Yogins hail. To Nīlakaṇṭha hail. To the Boar-faced One hail. To the One with the face of Narasiṃha hail. To One who has a lotus in His hand hail. To the Holder of a cakra in His hand hail. To One who sports a lotus(?) in His hand hail. To Nīlakaṇṭha the tiger hail. To the mighty Śaṇkara hail.
4. Adoration to the Triple Gem. Adoration to ārya Avalokiteśvarā, hail.

Korean version

The Korean form of the dhāraṇī stands midway between the short and the long versions; despite being generally more akin to the shorter version used in other East Asian countries, it exhibits certain readings found in the longer version (see 'Longer version' below).

(Hangul)
나모라 다나다라 야야 나막알약 바로기제 새바라야 모지사다바야 마하 사다바야 마하가로 니가야
옴 살바 바예수 다라나 가라야 다사명 나막 까리다바 이맘 알야 바로기제 새바라 다바 니라간타 나막 하리나야 마발다 이사미 살발타 사다남 수반 아예염 살바 보다남 바바말아 미수다감
다냐타 옴 아로계 아로가마지 로가 지가란제 혜혜 하례 마하 모지사다바 사마라 사마라 하리나야 구로 구로 갈마 사다야 사다야 도로 도로 미연제 마하미연제 다
라 다라 다린나례새바라 자라 자라 마라 미마라 아마라 몰제 예혜혜 로게새바라 라아 미사미 나사야 나베사 미사미 나사야 모하 자라 미사미 나사야 호로호로 마라 호로 하례 바나마 나바 사라사라 시리시리 소로소로 못자못자 모다야 모다야 매다리야 니라간타 가마사 날사남 바라하 라나야 마낙 사바하 싯다야 사바하 마하싯다야 사바하 싯다 유예새바라야 사바하 니라간타야 사바하 바라하 목하 싱하 목카야 사바하 바나마 하따야 사바하 자가라 욕다야 사바하 상카 섭나네 모다나야 사바하 마하 라구타다라야 사바하 바마사간타 이사 시체다 가릿나 이나야 사바하 마가라 잘마이바사나야 사바하
나모라 다나다라 야야 나막알야 바로기제 새바라야 사바하 (3번)

(Romanization)
Namo radana darayaya. Namak aryak. Barogije saebaraya. Mojisadabaya. Maha sadabaya. Mahagaronigaya.
Om. Salba bayesu. Darana garaya dasamyeong. Namak kkaridaba imam arya. Barogijesaebara daba. Niraganta namak harinaya. Mabalda isami. Salbalta sadanam suban. Ayeyeom. Salba bodanam. Babamara misudagam.
Danyata. Om arogye aroga majiroga. Jigaranje. Hye hye harye. Maha moji sadaba. Samara samara. Harinaya. Guroguro galma. Sadaya sadaya. Doro doro miyeonje. Maha miyeonje. Dara dara. Darin. Narye saebara. Jara jara. Mara mimara amara. Moljeye. Hye hye. Rogye saebara ra-a. Misami nasaya. Nabe sami sami nasaya. Moha jara misami nasaya. Horo horo. Mara horo harye. Banama naba. Sara sara. Siri siri. Soro soro. Motjya motjya. Modaya modaya. Maedariya. Niraganta. Gamasa nalsanam. Baraharanaya manak. Sabaha. Sitdaya. Sabaha. Mahasitdaya. Sabaha. Sitda yuye saebaraya. Sabaha. Niragantaya. Sabaha. Baraha mokka. Singha mokkaya. Sabaha. Banama hattaya. Sabaha. Jagara yokdaya. Sabaha. Sangka seopnane. Modanaya. Sabaha. Mahara guta daraya. Sabaha. Bamasa ganta isasi cheda. Garinna inaya. Sabaha. Magara jalma. Ibasanaya. Sabaha.
Namo radana darayaya. Namak aryak barogije. Saebaraya sabaha.

Reconstructed Sanskrit text

The following is a reconstruction of the underlying Sanskrit text of the Korean version as given in Chandra (1988).

Namo ratna-trayāya | nama āryāvalokiteśvarāya bodhisattvāya mahāsattvāya mahākāruṇikāya |
Oṃ sarva-bhayeṣu trāṇa-karāya tasmai namaskṛtvā imaṃ āryāvalokiteśvara-stavaṃ Nīlakaṇṭha-nāma |
hṛdayaṃ vartayiṣyāmi sarvārtha-sādhanaṃ śubhaṃ |
ajeyaṃ sarva-bhutānāṃ bhava-mara-viśodhakaṃ ||
TADYATHĀ | Oṃ āloka e āloka-mati lokātikrānta ehy-ehi Hare mahābodhisattva | smara smara hṛdayam | hi hi hare āryāvalokiteśvara maheśvara parama-maitra-citta mahākāruṇikā | kuru-kuru karma | sādhaya-sādhaya | dehi-dehi me varaṃ kamaṃ | dhuru-dhuru vijayate mahāvijayate | dhara-dhara dharāṇiṃdhareśvara | cala-cala malla vimal-āmala-mūṛtte | ehy-ehi Lokeśvara | rāga-viṣaṃ viṇāśaya | dveṣa-viṣaṃ viṇāśaya | moha-jāla-viṣaṃ viṇāśaya | hulu-hulu malla | hulu Hare Padmanābha | sara-sara siri-siri suru-suru | buddhya-buddhya bodhaya-bodhaya maitriya Nīlakaṇṭha | kāmasya darśanena prahlādaya manaḥ svāhā |
siddhāya svāhā | mahāsiddhāya svāhā | siddha-yogeśvarāya svāhā | Nīlakaṇṭhāya svāhā | Vāraha-mukha-siṃha-mukhāya svāhā | padma-hastāya svāhā | cakrāyudhāya svāhā | śaṇkha-śabda-nibodhanaya svāhā | mahā-lakuṭa-dharāya svāhā | vāma-skanda-deśa-sthita-kṛṣṇājināya svāhā | vyāghra-carma-nivasanāya svāhā ||
Namo ratna-trayāya | namaḥ āryāvalokiteśvarāya svāhā ||

Amoghavajra (Taishō Tripiṭaka 1111)

A different transliteration of the text (interpersed with pronunciation guides and glosses), also by Amoghavajra (T. 1111), runs:

曩謨(引)羅怛曩(二合)怛羅(二合)夜(引)也(三寶)曩莫(稽首)阿(去、引)里也(二合)嚩路(引)枳帝(引)濕嚩(二合)囉(引)也(聖觀自在)冒(引)地薩怛嚩(二合)也摩賀(引)薩怛嚩(二合)也摩訶(引)迦(引)嚕抳迦也(大悲者)薩嚩滿(上)馱曩砌(引)娜曩(割)迦羅(引)(斷)也(能斷一切繫縛)薩嚩婆(去)嚩(三有)娑悶訥嚕(二合)醋灑拏(上)迦羅也(能竭三有海一切生死苦)薩嚩弭也(二合)地鉢羅(二合)捨麼曩迦羅也(令息一切疾病)薩吠底庾(二合)鉢捺囉(二合)嚩尾曩(引)捨曩迦羅也(能斷一切災過)薩嚩婆(引)曳(引)數怛囉(二合)拏也(救濟怖畏)怛寫曩莫娑訖哩(二合)怛嚩(二合)伊娜麼(引)哩也(二合)嚩路(引)枳帝(引)濕嚩(二合)羅(我今禮彼聖觀自在)多嚩𩕳(引)攞蹇綻(勅諫反；居舉反)曩摩(引)紇哩(二合)乃也(二合)(聖者青頸心真言)麼嚩多以灑(二合)弭(我今說)薩嚩他(利益)娑馱南輸(上)𠰢(蒲反)(一切利益成就清淨)阿逝(慈際反)問薩嚩步(引去)多南(於諸鬼神得勝)婆縛沫㗚誐尾戍馱劍(本能淨三有道)怛儞也(二合)他(所謂；亦云即說)唵(釋在如意輪)阿路計(光明)阿(志)路迦麼底(光明慧)路迦(引)底訖𡃤(二合)帝(超世閒)呬呬賀㘑(魔慶哉師子)摩賀(引)冐地薩怛嚩(二合)係冐(引)地薩怛嚩(二合)鉢哩(二合)也冐(引)地薩怛嚩(二合)(慶哉於敏菩薩)係迦嚕(引)抳迦娑麼(二合)羅訖哩(二合)乃閻(慶哉大悲憶念心真言)呬呬(引)賀㘑阿哩也(二合)嚩路枳帝濕嚩(二合)囉(慶哉師子王觀自在)摩係(引)濕嚩(二合)羅(大自在)跛羅摩每怛羅(二合)唧多(界勝慈心)麼賀(引)迦嚕抳迦(大悲者)矩嚕羯摩(作復作事業)娑馱也娑馱也尾淰(明成就引後)禰呬(引與)禰呬(引與)禰呬銘嚩㘕(與我願)迦(引)懵(引)誐底(所希室)尾怛誐麼(皆如意)尾誐麼(遠離隱)悉馱裕(引)儗(引、霓異反)濕嚩(二合)囉(成就喻伽自在)度嚕度嚕尾演底(住持遊空者)摩訶(引)尾演底(大遊空者)馱羅馱羅馱連(引)捺連(二合)濕嚩(二合)囉(持復持帝王自在)左攞左攞(動)尾麼攞(引)麼攞沒㗚(二合)帝(動搖離垢離垢身)阿(去)哩也嚩路枳帝濕嚩(二合)囉(引)爾曩訖哩(二合)史拏(聖觀自在菩薩角格披鹿皮衣)惹吒矩吒(去、引)嚩覽摩鉢羅(二合)覽摩(頭冠瓔珞垂諸華鬘)摩賀(引)悉馱尾儞也(二合、引)馱羅(大成就持明佛)摩羅(引)摩羅(引)摩賀(引)摩羅沫羅沫羅摩賀(引)沫羅(內垢外垢大無垢)左羅左羅摩賀左羅(動復動大無動)訖哩(二合)史拏(二合)韈囉(二合)拏訖哩(二合)史拏(二合)博乞灑(二合)涅伽(去)多(上)曩(能推黑色明儻)係(引)摩賀(引)鉢納麼(二合)賀娑多(二合)(慶哉蓮華手)左羅左羅𩕳舍(引)左㘑(引)濕嚩(二合)羅(行復行觀行自在)訖哩(二合)史拏(二合、上)薩波訖哩(二合)多(上)演女(泥庾反、引)跛尾(引)多(黑蛇作繩線)曀醯(去、引)呬摩賀(引)嚩囉(引)賀穆佉(來來大猪頭)底哩(二合)補囉娜賀寧(引)濕嚩(二合)羅(梵燒言宮自在者)曩羅(引)也拏嚕(引)跛(引)摩羅吠(引)誐馱(引)哩(引)(持那羅延力形力持進者)係𩕳(引)攞蹇𡛥(青頸)係(引)摩賀(引)賀(引)攞(引)賀(引)攞尾灑涅(寧逸反)哩(二合)爾(慈反引)多(引)(慶哉大猛惡毒得勝者)路(引)羯寫囉(引)誐尾灑尾曩(引)捨曩(除滅世間瞋毒)謨賀尾灑(引)尾曩(引)捨曩(除滅世間癡毒)戶嚕戶嚕摩羅戶嚕賀㘑(速疾蓮華鬘速疾)摩賀鉢納摩曩(引)婆(引、呼)(師子王蓮花者，觀自在菩薩即是覺花，亦名佛蓮花)薩羅薩羅(蓮花)悉哩悉哩(蓮花)蘇嚕蘇嚕(蓮花頸)沒地也(二合)沒地野(二合)(所覺所)冐駄野冐馱野弭帝係(我令彼有情覺悟)𩕳羅蹇姹曀醯(引)呬嚩(引)麼娑體(二合)多僧(去)賀穆佉(上、引)(未來左住師子面)賀娑(上)賀娑(上)(笑)悶左悶左(放)摩賀(引)吒吒(上)賀(引)娑(去)(大訶訶笑)(去)呬(引)暴(引)摩賀(引)悉馱裕(去引)儗濕嚩(二合)羅(來來大成就瑜伽自在者)婆(上)拏婆拏嚩(引)簪(作舍反)(說語也)娑馱也娑馱也(引)尾淰(成就成就真言明)娑麼(二合)羅娑麼(二合)羅擔婆(去)誐挽(無滿反)耽路枳多尾路枳耽怛他(去、引)蘖耽(大憶念憶念也尊觀照觀察)娜娜(引)呬銘薩嚩薩怛嚩(二合)喃(與一切眾生)捺囉(二合)捨曩迦末寫捺羅(二合)捨喃鉢羅(二合)賀羅(二合)娜也摩諾娑嚩(二合)賀(引)(樂見者令見、令意歡悅)悉馱也娑嚩(二合)賀(成就福智圓滿)摩賀悉馱也娑嚩(二合)賀(大成就福德)悉馱裕儗濕嚩(二合)羅也娑嚩(二合)賀(成就瑜伽自在者圓滿)𩕳羅蹇姹(引)也娑嚩(二合)賀(引青頸)嚩羅賀穆佉(去、引)也娑嚩(二合)賀(引)(大師子面福智圓滿)悉馱尾儞也(二合)馱羅(引)也娑嚩(二合)賀(成就持明福智圓滿)鉢納麼(二合)賀娑跢(二合)也娑嚩(二合)賀(蓮花手福智圓滿)訖哩(二合)史拏(二合)薩跛訖哩(二合)多(上)演女(呢庾反二合)跛尾多也娑嚩(二合)賀(黑蛇作神線福德)摩賀羅矩吒馱羅(引)也娑嚩(二合)賀(持大杖者福圓滿)斫訖羅(二合)庾馱(引)也娑嚩(二合)賀(持輪器仗者)賞佉攝娜(二合)𩕳冐(引)馱(引)曩(引)也娑嚩(二合)賀(法螺聲驚覺)嚩麼娑蹇(二合)馱禰捨娑體(二合、池以反)多訖哩(二合)史拏(二合)爾曩(引)也娑嚩(二合)賀(左肩所住被黑鹿皮願智圓滿)尾也(二合)伽羅(二合)拶麼𩕳嚩薩曩(引)也娑嚩(二合)賀(鹿皮裙者)路計濕嚩(二合)羅也娑嚩(二合)賀(觀自在菩薩福德圓滿)薩嚩悉第濕嚩(二合)羅也娑嚩(二合)賀(一切成就自在)曩謨婆誐嚩帝(歸命也)阿哩也(二合)嚩路枳帝(引)濕嚩(二合)羅也(聖觀自在菩薩)冐地薩怛嚩(二合)也摩訶薩怛嚩(二合)也(勇猛者)摩賀迦嚕抳迦也(大悲者)悉鈿覩滿怛羅(二合)跛娜(引)也(真言句願成就)娑嚩(二合)賀(引)(一百一十)

Longer version

Vajrabodhi (Taishō Tripiṭaka 1061)

The following is a transliteration of the longer version of the dhāraṇī and an accompanying Sanskrit version (originally written in Siddhaṃ; given in Romanized form below) made by Vajrabodhi (T. 1061).

曩慕　囉(引)怛曩(二合)怛囉(二合)夜耶(一)　曩莫　阿(引)哩夜(二合)(二)　嚩枳諦濕嚩(二合)囉(引)耶(三)　冐(毛上音、下同)地薩多嚩(二合、下同)耶(四)　莽(浮聲呼)賀薩多嚩(同上)耶(五)　莽(浮聲呼)賀迦(去)嚕聹(卷舌呼)迦(引)耶(六)　薩摩(上)滿陀(上)曩(七)　泚娜曩迦囉(引)耶(八)　薩摩(上)　婆嚩(九)　娑母(浮聲呼)捺嘮(二合)　酢灑拏(卷舌呼)迦囉耶(十)　薩摩(上)　彌夜(二合)地(十一)　跛囉(二合)捨莽(浮聲呼)曩迦囉(引)耶(十二)　薩謎底多庾(二合)　跛捺囉(二合)嚩(十三)　尾那捨曩(浮聲呼)迦囉(引)耶(十四)　薩摩(上)　婆曳數(十五)　怛囉(二合)拏迦囉(去、引)耶(十六)　嚲思每(二合)　曩莽思吉哩(三合)多嚩(二合)　伊(去)那摩阿哩夜(二合)(十七)　嚩枳帝濕嚩(二合)囉　皤使單　儞羅建姹閉(十八)　曩(引)莽纈哩(二合)娜耶(十九)　摩物剌(二合)嚲　以使夜(二合)弭(二十)　薩末(引)他些馱建(二十一)　戍畔　阿爾延(二十二)(引)　　薩摩　部跢南(二十三)　婆嚩末誐　尾戍馱劍(二十四)　怛儞也(二合)他(二十五)　唵(二十六)　阿(引)計　阿(引)迦莽底(二十七)　迦(引)底訖㘓(二合)諦　傒　賀㘑　阿哩夜(二十八)　嚩枳諦濕嚩(二合)羅(二十九)　莽(浮聲呼)賀冐地薩多嚩(二合)(三十)　傒　冐地薩多嚩(二合)(三十一)　傒　莽(浮聲呼)賀冐地薩多嚩(二合)(三十二)　傒　比哩(二合)也　冐地薩多嚩(二合)(三十三)　　傒　莽(浮聲呼)賀迦(引)嚕聹(卷舌呼)迦(三十四)　徙莽(二合)囉　纈哩(二合)娜延(三十五)　呬呬　賀㘑　阿哩耶(三十六)　嚩枳諦濕嚩(二合)囉(三十七)　莽(浮聲呼)傒　濕嚩(二合)囉(三十八)　跛囉莽(浮聲呼)　多囉(二合)質多(三十九)　莽(浮聲呼)賀迦嚕聹(卷舌呼)迦(四十)　矩嚕　矩嚕　羯滿　些大耶　些大耶(四十一)　尾儞延(二合)(四十二)　聹傒　禰傒多　嚩㘓(四十三)　迦滿　誐莽(四十四)　尾捍誐莽　尾誐莽　悉陀(上)　諭儗(引)濕嚩(二合)囉(四十五)　杜嚕　杜嚕　尾演底(四十六)　莽賀尾演底(四十七)　馱囉　馱羅　達㘑印涅㘑(三合)濕嚩(二合)羅(四十八)　左攞　左攞　尾莽(浮聲呼)邏　莽羅(四十九)　阿哩夜(二合)(五十)　嚩枳帝濕嚩(二合)羅(去)(五十一)　爾曩　訖哩(二合)使拏(二合)(五十二)　惹吒(引)莽(浮聲呼)矩吒(五十三)　嚩覽摩　跛羅(二合)覽摩　尾覽摩(五十四)　莽(浮聲呼)賀徙陀(上)尾儞夜(二合)馱囉(五十五)　皤羅　皤囉　莽賀皤囉(五十六)　麼攞　麼攞　莽賀麼攞(五十七)　左囉　左囉　莽賀左囉(五十八)　訖哩(二合)史拏(二合)物㗚(二合)拏儞㗚伽(五十九)　訖哩(二合)史拏(二合)跛乞灑(二合)　怩茄(去)跢曩(浮聲呼)(六十)　傒　跛娜莽(二合)賀徙多(二合)(六十一)　左羅　左羅　聹舍　左㘑濕嚩(二合)囉(六十二)　訖哩(二合)史拏(二合)薩囉跛　訖哩(二合)嚲也爾諭(二合)跛尾多(六十三)　翳傒兮　莽(浮聲呼)賀嚩囉賀母(浮聲呼)佉(六十四)　怛哩(二合)補囉娜賀寧濕嚩(二合)囉(六十五)　曩囉也拏　嚩跛(六十六)　嚩羅　末誐　阿(上)唎　傒　聹羅建姹　傒　麼賀迦(去)羅(六十七)　賀羅賀羅(六十八)　尾沙(上)　怩爾跢　迦寫(六十九)　囉(去)誐尾沙(上)尾曩(引)捨曩(七十)　那味(二合)沙(上)尾沙(上)　尾曩捨曩(七十一)　慕賀尾沙(上)　尾曩(引)捨曩(七十二)　戶嚕　戶嚕　莽羅　戶嚕　賀㘑(七十三)　莽賀　跛那莽(二合)曩(引)婆(七十四)　薩囉　薩囉(七十五)　徙哩　徙哩(七十六)　蘇嚕　蘇嚕(七十七)　母嚕　母嚕(七十八)　母地也(二合)　母地也(二合)(七十九)　冐大也(二合)　冐大也(二合)(八十)　弭帝(八十一)　儞囉建姹　翳醯兮　摩莽思體(二合)多徙應(二合)賀　母佉(八十二)　賀娑　賀娑(八十三)　悶左　悶左(八十四)　莽賀　吒(去)吒(上)賀珊(八十五)　翳　醯兮抱　莽賀悉陀(上)諭詣濕嚩(二合)羅(八十六)　娑拏　娑拏　嚩(引)濟(八十七)　些大耶　些大耶　尾儞延(二合)(八十八)　徙莽囉　徙莽羅(八十九)　瞻　婆誐滿單　枳多　尾枳單(九十)　計濕嚩(二合)㘓(去)　怛他(上)誐單(九十一)　娜娜(引)醯　名娜哩捨(二合)曩(九十二)　迦莽寫　那哩(二合)捨難(九十三)　跛囉(二合)紇邏(二合)娜耶莽曩　莎賀(九十四)　悉馱也　莎賀(九十五)　莽賀悉馱也　莎賀(九十六)　莽賀悉馱也　莎賀(九十七)　悉馱諭詣濕嚩(二合)邏耶　莎賀(九十八)　儞羅建姹耶　莎賀(九十九)　嚩囉(引)賀母佉(去)耶　莎賀(一百)　莽賀娜邏　徙應(二合)賀母佉耶　莎賀(一百一)　悉馱尾儞夜(二合)達邏耶　莎賀(一百二)　跛娜莽(二合)賀薩跢(二合)耶　莎賀(一百三)　訖哩(二合)史拏(二合)薩波訖哩(二合)也爾諭(二合)跛尾跢耶　莎賀(一百四)　莽賀攞矩吒陀(上)邏(去)耶　莎賀(一百五)　斫羯囉(去)庾馱耶　莎賀(一百六)　勝佉(去)攝那儞冐馱曩(去)耶　莎賀(一百七)　摩莽思建(二合)陀(上)味沙(上)思體(二合)多訖哩(二合)史拏(二合)爾曩(去)耶　莎賀(一百八)　弭夜(二合)佉囉(二合)折莽儞嚩娑曩(去)耶　莎賀(一百九)　計濕嚩(二合)羅(去)耶　莎賀(一百一十)　薩摩(上)　悉第濕嚩(二合)羅耶　莎賀(一百一十一)　曩慕　婆誐嚩諦　阿(引)哩夜(二合)嚩枳諦濕嚩(二合)囉(去)耶　冐地薩怛嚩(二合)耶　莽賀薩怛嚩(二合)耶　莽賀迦(去)嚕聹迦耶(一百一十二)　悉殿(二合)覩　名　滿多羅(二合)跛娜耶　莎賀(一百一十三)
na mo rā tna tra yā ya na maḥ ā ryā va lo ki te śva rā ya bo dhi sa tvā ya ma hā sa tvā ya ma hā kā ru ṇi kā ya sa rva ba ndha na cche da na ka rā ya sa rva bha va sa mu draṃ su kṣa ṇa ka rā ya sa rva vya dhi pra śa ma na ka rā ya sa rve ti tyu bha ndra va vi nā śa na ka rā ya sa rva bha ye ṣyo tra ṇa ka rā ya ta smai na ma skṛ tvā i na mā ryā va lo ki te śva ra bha ṣi taṃ ni ra kaṃ ṭa bhe nā ma hṛ da ya ma vra ta i cchya mi sa rvā tha sa dha kaṃ śu vaṃ a ji yaṃ sa rva bhū ta naṃ bha va ma rga vi śu ddha kaṃ ta dya thā oṃ ā lo ke ā lo ka ma ti lo kā ti kraṃ te he ha re ā ryā va lo ki te śva ra ma hā bo dhi sa tva he bo dhi sa tva he ma hā vo dhi sa tva he vi rya bo dhi sa tva he ma hā kā ru ṇi kā smī ra hṛ da yaṃ hi hi ha re ā ryā va lo ki te śva ra ma he śva ra pa ra ma tra ci tta ma hā kā ru ṇi kā ku ru ku ru ka rmaṃ sa dha ya sa dha ya vi ddhyaṃ ṇi he ṇi he ta va raṃ ka maṃ ga ma vi ga ma si ddha yu ge śva ra dhu ru dhu ru vi ya nti ma hā vi ya nti dha ra dha ra dha re i ndre śva ra ca la ca la vi ma la ma ra ā ryā va lo ki te śva ra ji na kṛ ṣṇi ja ṭā ma ku ṭa va raṃ ma pra raṃ ma vi raṃ ma ma hā si ddha vi dya dha ra va ra va ra ma hā va ra ba la ba la ma hā ba la ca ra ca ra ma hā ca ra kṛ ṣṇi vṛ ṇa dī rgha kṛ ṣṇi pa kṣa dī rgha ta na he pa dma ha sti ca ra ca ra di śa ca le śva ra kṛ ṣṇi sa ra pa kṛ ta ya jyo pa vi ta e hye he ma hā va ra ha mu kha tri pū ra da ha ne śva ra na ra ya ṇa va ru pa va ra ma rga a ri he ni ra kaṃ ṭa he ma hā kā ra ha ra ha ra vi ṣa ni rji ta lo ka sya rā ga vi ṣa vi nā śa na dvi ṣa vi ṣa vi nā śa na mu ha vi ṣa vi nā śa na hu lu hu lu ma ra hu lu ha le ma hā pa dma nā bha sa ra sa ra si ri si ri su ru su ru mu ru mu ru bu ddhya bu ddhya bo ddha ya bo ddha ya mai te ni ra kaṃ ṭa e hye he ma ma sthi ta syiṃ ha mu kha ha sa ha sa muṃ ca muṃ ca ma hā ṭā ṭa ha saṃ e hye he paṃ ma hā si ddha yu ge śva ra sa ṇa sa ṇa vā ce sa dha ya sa dha ya vi ddhyaṃ smī ra smi ra śaṃ bha ga vaṃ taṃ lo ki ta vi lo ki taṃ lo ke śva raṃ ta thā ga taṃ da dā he me da rśa na ka ma sya da rśa naṃ pra kra da ya ma na svā hā si ddhā ya svā hā ma hā si ddhā ya svā hā si ddhā yo ge śva ra ya svā hā ni ra kaṃ ṭa ya svā hā va rā ha mu khā ya svā hā ma hā da ra syiṃ ha mu kha ya svā hā si ddha vi ddhya dha ra ya svā hā pa dma ha sta ya svā hā kṛ ṣṇi sa rpa kṛ dhya ya jyo pa vi ta ya svā hā ma hā la ku ṭa dha rā ya svā hā ca kra yu dha ya svā hā śa ṅkha śa bda ni bo ddha nā ya svā hā ma ma ska nda vi ṣa sthi ta kṛ ṣṇi ji nā ya svā hā vyā ghra ca ma ni va sa nā ya svā hā lo ke śva rā ya svā hā sa rva si ddhe śva ra ya svā hā na mo bha ga va te ā ryā va lo ki te śva rā ya bo dhi sa tvā ya ma hā sa tvā ya ma hā kā ru ṇi kā ya si ddhya ntu me va ntra pa dā ya svā hā

Reconstructed Sanskrit text

Vajrabodhi's Sanskrit text as reconstructed by Chandra (1988):

Namo ratna-trayāya | nama āryĀvalokiteśvarāya bodhisattvāya mahāsattvāya mahākāruṇikāya sarva-bandhana-cchedana-karāya sarva-bhava-samudra-śoṣaṇa-karāya sarva-vyādhi-praśamana-karāya sarv-ety-upadrava-vināśana-karāya sarva-bhayeṣu trāṇa-karāya | tasmai namaskṛtvā imaṃ āryĀvalokiteśvara-bhāṣitaṃ Nīlakaṇṭha-nāma |
hṛdayaṃ vartayiṣyāmi sarv-ārtha-sādhakaṃ śubhaṃ |
ajeyaṃ sarva-bhutānāṃ bhava-mārga-viśodhakaṃ ||
TADYATHĀ | oṃ āloka e āloka-mati lokātikrānta ehi Hare āryĀvalokiteśvara mahābodhisattva | he bodhisattva he mahābodhisattva 
he virya-bodhisattva he mahākāruṇikā smara hṛdayaṃ | ehy-ehi Hare āryĀvalokiteśvara Maheśvara paramārtha-citta mahākāruṇikā | kuru-kuru karma | sādhaya-sādhaya vidyam | dehi-dehi tvaraṃ kāmam gama vihaṇgama vigama siddha-yogeśvara | dhuru-dhuru viyanta e mahā-viyanta e | dhara-dhara dharendreśvara | cala-cala vimal-āmala āryĀvalokiteśvara Jina | kṛṣṇa-jaṭā-makuṭā 'varama prarama virama mahāsiddha-vidyādhara | bala-bala mahābala malla-malla mahāmalla cala cala Mahācala | kṛṣṇa-varṇa dīrgha-kṛṣṇa-pakṣa-nirghātana he padma-hasta | cara cara niśācareśvara
kṛṣṇa-sarpa-kṛta-yajñopavīta | ehy-ehi mahāVarāha-mukha Tripura-dahan-eśvara Nārāyaṇa-balopabala-veśa-dhara | he Nīlakaṇṭha he Mahākāla halāhala-viṣa nirjita lokasya rāga-viṣa vināśana dveṣa-viṣa-vināśana moha-viṣa-viṇāśana hulu-hulu malla | hulu Hare Mahā-Padmanābha | sara-sara siri-siri suru-suru muru-muru budhya-budhya bodhaya-bodhaya bodhayā maitriya Nīlakaṇṭha | ehy-ehi vāma-sthita-Siṃha-mukha | hasa-hasa muñca-muñca mahāṭṭahāsam | ehy-ehi bho mahāsiddha-yogeśvara | bhaṇa-bhaṇa vācaṃ | sādhaya-sādhaya vidyāṃ | smara-smara taṃ bhagavantaṃ lokita-vilokitaṃ Lokeśvaram tathāgataṃ | dadāhi me darśana-kāmasya darśanam | prahlādaya manaḥ svāhā |
siddhāya svāhā | mahāsiddhāya svāhā | siddha-yogeśvarāya svāhā | Nīlakaṇṭhāya svāhā | Varāha-mukhāya svāhā | MahāNarasiṃha-mukhāya svāhā | siddha-vidyādharāya svāhā | padma-hastāya svāhā | kṛṣṇa-sarpa-kṛta-yajñopavitāya svāhā | mahā-Lakuṭadharāya svāhā | cakr-āyudhāya svāhā | śaṇkha-śabda-nibodhanāya svāhā | vāma-skandha-deśa-sthita-kṛṣṇ-ājināya svāhā | vyāghra-carma-nivasanāya svāhā | Lokeśvarāya svāhā  | sarva-siddheśvaraya svāhā |
Namo bhagavate āryĀvalokiteśvarāya bodhisattvāya mahāsattvāya mahākāruṇikāya |
Siddhyantu me mantra-padāni svāhā ||

Analysis

As noted above, the longer version as preserved by Vajrabodhi provides evidence that the dhāraṇī, in its original form, was a recitation of Nīlakaṇṭha's names by Avalokiteśvara (Āryāvalokiteśvara-bhāṣitaṃ Nīlakaṇṭha-nāma "the names of Nīlakaṇṭha uttered (bhāṣita) by ārya Avalokiteśvara"), suggesting that the two figures were not yet conflated with each other at this stage. This version also contains more epithets associated with Shiva and Vishnu than the standard shorter version, such as Maheśvara, Mahākāla, Tripura-dahaneśvara, Mahācala ("the great immovable (acala) one"), Lakuṭadhara ("the bearer of a club"; cf. Lakulisha), halāhala-viṣa nirjita ("subduer of the halāhala poison"), vyāghra-carma-nivasana ("he who wears a tiger skin"), Nārāyaṇa-balopabala-veśa-dhara ("having the prowess and vestments (veśa) of Nārāyaṇa"), Padmanābha ("the lotus-naveled"), or śaṇkha-śabda-nibodhana ("he who awakens (with the) sound of a conch").

Comparison of various Sanskrit versions

The following Sanskrit texts are synoptically arranged for comparison:

 The Sanskrit of Amoghavajra (T. 1113b; spelling as in the received text)
 A fragmentary manuscript of the dhāraṇī from Dunhuang (Pelliot chinois 2778)
 A reconstruction of the standard text of the dhāraṇī based on Bhagavaddharma and Amoghavajra by Lokesh Chandra (1988)
 The underlying Sanskrit of the Korean version
 The Sanskrit of Vajrabodhi (T. 1061; spelling as in the received text)
 A (partial) transcription of the Sanskrit-Sogdian manuscript of the dhāraṇī from Dunhuang (Or.　8212/175; spelling as in the manuscript)
 A reconstruction of the longer text of the dhāraṇī based on Vajrabodhi by Lokesh Chandra (1988)

See also 
Avalokiteśvara
Buddhism and Hinduism
Dhāraṇī
Harihara
Mahayana sutras
Śūraṅgama Mantra
Uṣṇīṣa Vijaya Dhāraṇī Sūtra
Dharani pillar

Notes

References

Works cited

External links
Great Compassion Dharani Sutra - English translation of Mahākaruṇika Dhāraṇī Sutra
Fragment of the dhāraṇī (Pelliot chinois 2778) discovered in Dunhuang, from Gallica, Bibliothèque nationale de France's digital library
English translation of Bhagavaddharma's text (T. 1060)
Evening service (晚課) in Fu Yan Buddhist Institute (福嚴佛學院) - The dhāraṇī recited as part of a Chinese Buddhist evening service (43:55-47:16)
천수경 (千手經): The Thousand-Armed Avalokiteśvara Sutra - The dhāraṇī as chanted in Korean
Daihishin Darani (大悲心陀羅尼) - The Sōtō Zen version of the dhāraṇī by Soto Zen Young Buddhist Priest Association

Buddhist mantras
Buddhist tantras
Avalokiteśvara